A Little Bit of Fluff may refer to:

 A Little Bit of Fluff (play), a 1915 play by Walter Ellis
 A Little Bit of Fluff (1919 film), a 1919 film adaptation by Kenelm Foss
 A Little Bit of Fluff (1928 film), a 1928 film adaptation